USS Ahdeek (SP-2589) was a United States Navy patrol vessel in commission from 1918 to 1919.

Ahdeek was built as a private single-screw wooden-hulled motorboat in 1916 by the Charles L. Seabury Company and Gas Engine and Power Company at Morris Heights in the Bronx, New York, for H. V. Schieren. On 7 April 1918, the 3rd Naval District inspected her for possible U.S. Navy use as an "aeronautic patrol" boat during World War I. Ordered taken over by the Navy on 12 June 1918, she finally was acquired by the Navy on 2 September 1918 and assigned the section patrol number 2589. She was commissioned as USS Ahdeek (SP-2589).

Ahdeek served on section patrol duty for the rest of World War I and into 1919. On 23 June 1919, a dispatch directed the Commandant, 3rd Naval District, to ship her and the patrol boat  to the Culver Naval School in Culver, Indiana. Ahdeek operated there on loan from the Navy for many years. She finally was stricken from the Navy Directory on 25 October 1933.

Notes

References
 
 Department of the Navy Naval History and Heritage Command Online Library of Selected Images: Civilian Ships: Ahdeek (American Motor Boat, 1916). Served as USS Ahdeek (SP-2589) in 1918–1919
  NavSource Online: Section Patrol Craft Photo archive Ahdeek (SP 2589)

Patrol vessels of the United States Navy
World War I patrol vessels of the United States
Ships built in Morris Heights, Bronx
1916 ships